The A Pioneer District is a high school conference in the state of Virginia that comprises high schools located in Southwest Virginia

History
The District was originally composed of small schools in the Allegany Highlands and northern and western Roanoke Valley.  In 2017, the VHSL shuffled many districts, including the Three Rivers, because of demographic changes.  In an effort to have schools of similar size competing in the same districts, James River, who had largely dominated the district and had by far the largest enrollment, was shifted to the Three Rivers District.  To replace the Knights, Eastern Montgomery High School of the Three Rivers District and Narrows High School of the Mountain Empire District shifted to the Pioneer.

Geographic makeup
The Pioneer District comprises high schools in the Alleghany Highlands and the Roanoke, New River, and southern Shenandoah Valleys. This Alleghany Highlands is probably best known for being the home of or at least nearby five-star vacation resorts such as The Homestead and The Greenbrier, the latter which is in West Virginia.

Although the schools in the Pioneer District are very small in size, most of its members do field teams in most of the sports offered by the Virginia High School League.  One notable exception to this is football, with Highland High School not participating because of its small enrollment.  The largest school in the Pioneer District is Parry McCluer High School, located in Buena Vista, Virginia (with about 365 students), and the smallest is Highland, located in Monterey, Virginia.  Due to its size, Parry McCluer has dominated most of the district's sports in recent years, culminating with their winning of 5 state football championships. .

Regional and state competition
While the VHSL uses District formatting for regular season contests and determining postseason eligibility, the teams are divided into different classes and regions for Regional and State-level competitions.  The Pioneer District is fairly unique when compared to other local districts as all members complete in Class 1, Region C (as of 2022).:

Member schools

Former Members

References

External links
PMHS Homepage
BCHS Homepage
CHS Homepage
CCHS Homepage
JRHS Homepage
 HHS Homepage

Virginia High School League